Tørberget is a small village in Trysil municipality, Innlandet county, Norway. It is the birthplace of Olympian Hallgeir Brenden. Tørberget Church is located in the village.

References

Trysil
Villages in Innlandet